Sanom is a district (amphoe) in the northern part of Surin province, northeastern Thailand.

History
The original name of the main town was Ban Nong Sanom (บ้านหนองสนม), which was a village under Mueang Surin. In 1893 it was reassigned to Mueang Rattanaburi, the present-day Rattanaburi district.

The minor district (king amphoe) Sanom was established on 1 July 1971, when the five tambons Sanom, Khaen, Na Nuan, Nong Rakhang, and Phon Ko were split off from Rattanaburi District. It was upgraded to a full district on 12 April 1977.

Geography
Neighboring districts are (from the north clockwise): Rattanaburi, Non Narai, Samrong Thap, Sikhoraphum, Chom Phra and Tha Tum.

Administration
The district is divided into seven sub-districts (tambons), which are further subdivided into 78 villages (mubans). Sanom is a township (thesaban tambon) which covers parts of tambon Sanom. There are a further seven tambon administrative organizations (TAO).

References

External links
amphoe.com

Sanom